John Ebnezar is known for promoting wholistic orthopedics, a practice combining modern medical techniques with yoga for the management of Osteoarthritis of the knees and other chronic Orthopedic problems like lower back pain, neck pain, frozen shoulder etc. He was twice listed by the Guinness Book of World Records in 2010 and 2012 for the most books written by an individual in one year.

Works

. He is the author of over 200 books, all related to medical science, and is the only Indian orthopedic surgeon to have his books translated into Spanish and Italian. Among his notable books are Textbook of Orthopedics: With Clinical Examination Methods in Orthopedics, John Ebnezar Cbs Handbooks in Orthopedics and Fractures, Step by Step: Injection Techniques in Orthopaedics, Step by Step: Emergency in Orthopaedics, Low Back Pain and Practical Orthopedics.

Awards

He received a Best Research Award from SVYASA Yoga University, Bangalore for his work on OA Knees in 2012 and on the Role of Yoga on fracture treatment (2010). He also received Best Research Award for the Role of Yoga in Spinal Cord Injuries in 2021 from Svyasa Yoga University, Bangalore.

He is a recipient of Rajyotsava Prashasti, the second highest civilian award of the Government of Karnataka, which he received in 2010, Kempegowda Award(2011). The Government of India awarded him the fourth highest civilian honour of the Padma Shri, in 2016, for his contributions to medical science. He received Dr BC Roy National Award,the highest award in the Field of Medicine in India in 2016. He received the Silver Jubilee Research National Award from MCI in 2017.

See also 
 Yoga
 Arthritis

References

External links 
 

Recipients of the Padma Shri in medicine
Year of birth missing (living people)
Medical doctors from Karnataka
Indian orthopedic surgeons
Indian medical writers
Recipients of the Rajyotsava Award 2010
Living people
20th-century Indian medical doctors
Dr. B. C. Roy Award winners
20th-century surgeons